Rybkinsky is a rural locality (a khutor) in Ryazanovsky Selsoviet, Sterlitamaksky District, Bashkortostan, Russia. The population was 12 as of 2010. There is 1 street.

Geography 
Rybkinsky is located 20 km west of Sterlitamak (the district's administrative centre) by road. Severnaya is the nearest rural locality.

References 

Rural localities in Sterlitamaksky District